Miltochrista spilosomoides is a moth of the family Erebidae first described by Frederic Moore in 1878. It is found in the Indian states of Sikkim and Assam.

References

spilosomoides
Moths described in 1878
Moths of Asia